Gerolamo Olivieri (died 1539) was a Roman Catholic prelate who served as Bishop of Acerno (1525–1539).

Biography
On 23 June 1525, he was appointed during the papacy of Pope Clement VII as Bishop of Acerno.
He served as Bishop of Acerno until his death in 1539.

References

External links and additional sources
 (for Chronology of Bishops) 
 (for Chronology of Bishops) 

16th-century Italian Roman Catholic bishops
Bishops appointed by Pope Clement VII
1539 deaths